The Union Internationale des Avocats (UIA) or International Association of Lawyers is an international non-governmental organisation, created in 1927, that brings together more than 2,200 legal professionals from all over the world.

Historical Context 

At the end of the 19th century, most European lawyers worked within autonomous and independent bar associations, each with their own customs.
 
However, after World War I"," European lawyers gradually realized the importance of helping certain bar associations modernise and build international contacts 
 
In July 1925, lawyers from Belgium, France and Luxembourg initiated the "Union Internationale des Avocats" project, which came to fruition after two years of collaboration on July 8, 1927, in Charleroi, Belgium

The President of the Paris Bar Association, Georges Guillaumin, was nominated as the Association’s first president.
 
Once the UIA was formed, several bar associations sought its membership. After joining the Association, each new bar contributed unique efforts towards the UIA's dual objectives: adapting older bars to the new economic and international climate, and working with the League of Nations for the establishment of lasting peace.

Objectives 
Today, the UIA defends the legal profession and encourages international networking, cooperation and understanding among lawyers with due regard to their cultural and professional diversity

Two objectives underlie the UIA's activities: 
 Promote the essential principles of the legal profession and of the development of the legal field in all legal areas of specialisation at the international level.
 Contribute to the professional enrichment of its members via informational exchanges enabled by UIA commissions and working groups.

These twin objectives serve to widen the vision and strengthen the foundations for peace and the common good in societies and among people.

Missions 
Today, the UIA is an association open to all lawyers from around the world, general or specialized, and brings together several thousand members and 200 bar associations, federations, and associations from 110 countries.

Multilingual and multicultural, the UIA is the only major international lawyers organisation to have eight official languages (French, English, Spanish, Italian, German, Portuguese, Arabic, and Chinese) and to work in three working languages: French, English, and Spanish.

Moreover, the UIA has built more than 43 commissions composed of lawyers from jurisdictions spanning the globe. These lawyers practice in law firms, businesses, or public institutions. Each commission monitors the evolution occurring in a particular legal field (or practice) and determines how these changes will affect or be affected by other legal fields. All UIA commissions collaborate to keep each other informed of their respective developments and findings.

The UIA's commissions and working groups are divided into two principal fields: Business Law and General Practice and Human Rights

Business Law 
The UIA commissions and working groups in business law focus on competition law, contracts, bankruptcy, corporate law, labour, intellectual property law, tax, banking, mergers and acquisitions, mediation, the international sale of goods, and foreign investments, among many other practice areas.

The UIA collaborates with the United Nations Commission on International Trade Law (UNCITRAL) and notably presented a proposition for the definition of a "center of principal interests" (articles 2b) and 16-3 of the UNCITRAL law on international insolvency.

Every year, the UIA organises numerous seminars on international subjects. The UIA's events allow participants to meet colleagues, establish professional contacts and to debate questions about current events and controversial legal topics.

For its annual congress, the UIA creates working sessions for its commissions. These commissions produce reports accessible to all UIA members and organise congressional joint-sessions.

Each year, one or more principal themes are established for the Congress, inciting national and international legal and economic experts to engage in fruitful debate.

Protection of lawyers and Human Rights 
The UIA intervenes throughout the world in favour of lawyers who are imprisoned or persecuted for practising their profession.

Since 1971, the UIA has benefited from its special consultative status in the United Nations and the European Council. Through the European Council, the UIA produced a policy recommendation concerning money laundering and the War on Terror.

The UIA is represented in the three main offices of the United Nations (New York, Geneva, and Vienna), where the UIA organises a summit for international bar association presidents. These summits permit bar association presidents to further the work initiated by the UN in diverse domains of international law.

Additionally, the UIA sits at the heart of the Consultative Councils of the International Criminal Tribunal for the former Yugoslavia. 
Finally, the UIA has followed the work of the preparatory commission of the International Criminal Court since its creation in 1998. The UIA also attends sessions of the Assembly of States Parties to the Statute of the Court. The UIA is a member of the executive council of the International Criminal Bar.

Members 
 Individuals: Practising lawyers (general practitioners and specialists)
 Collective: bar associations
 Associated individuals: Law professors, judges and other legal professionals

Presidency 
The term of each UIA presidency is one year.

Past Presidents:

 1930-1931: , Belgium
 1932-1933: , Netherlands
 1936-1937: , Czechoslovakia
 1960-1962: Adelino da Palma Carlos, Portugal
 1964-1965: , Netherlands
 1969-1971: , France
 1971-1973: , Spain
 1979-1981: Harold H. Healy, Jr., United States
 1981-1983: , Luxembourg
 1987-1988: , Sweden
 1994-1995: Garry Downes Q.C., Australia
 1996-1997: Kottayan Katankot Venugopal, India
 2000-2001 : Miguel I. Estrada Samano, Mexico
 2005-2006: Delos N.Lutton, 
 2006-2007: Paulo Lins E Silva, Rio de Janeiro, Brazil,
 2007-2008: Héctor Díaz-Bastien, Spain
 2013-2014: Stephen L. Dreyfuss, recipient of the Legion of Honour, received on May 30, 2014, United States
 2014-2015: M. Miguel Loinaz, Uruguay
 2015-2016: Jean-Jacques Uettwiller, France
 2016-2017: Laurence Bory, Switzerland
 2017-2018: Pedro Pais de Almeida, Portugal
2018-2019: Issouf Baadhio, Burkina Faso
2019-2020: Jerome Roth, United States
2020-2021: Jorge Martí Moreno, Spain
2021-2022: Hervé Chemouli, France

Annual Congress 

Since its creation, the UIA has organised annual congresses in locations all over the world for members and non-members to discuss legal topics in an international forum.

According to UIA Statutes, the organisation must convene a Congress at least once every two years. Between 1929 and 1938, UIA congresses were mainly annual. The 1939 Congress, which was scheduled to take place in Warsaw on the eve of the Second World War, did eventually not take place:

 1929 - I Congress: Brussels, Belgium
 1930 - II Congress: Paris, France
 1931 - III Congress: Luxembourg, Grand Duchy of Luxembourg
 1932 - IV Congress: The Hague, Netherlands
 1933 - V Congress: Dubrovnik, Croatia
 1935 - VI Congress: Brussels, Belgium
 1936 - VII Congress: Vienna, Austria
 1937 - VIII Congress: Vienna, Austria 
 1938 - IX Congress: Budapest, Hungary

The congressional process resumed in 1948, and a Congress was held annually until 1954 (except in 1952) :

 1948 - X Congress: Brussels, Belgium
 1949 - XI Congress: Paris, France
 1950 - XII Congress Luxembourg, Grand Duchy of Luxembourg
 1951 - XIII Congress: Rio de Janeiro, Brazil
 1953 - XIV Congress: Vienna, Austria

From 1954 to 1989, a Congress was held every two years :

 1954 - XV Congress: Brussels, Belgium
 1956 - XVI Congress: Paris, France
 1958 - XVII Congress: Milan, Italy
 1960 - XVIII Congress: Basel, Switzerland - The European Bar Council (CCBE) was created during this Congress
 1962 - XIX Congress: Lisbon, Portugal
 1964 - XX Congress: Bonn, Federal Republic of Germany 
 1965 - XXI Congress: Arnhem, Netherlands (exceptionally held the following year)
 1967 - XXII Congress: Vienna, Austria
 1969 - XXIII Congress: London, United Kingdom
 1971 - XXIV Congress: Paris, France
 1973 - XXV Congress: Madrid, Spain 
 1975 - XXVI Congress: Munich, Federal Republic of Germany
 1977 - XXVII Congress: Zagreb, Croatia 
 1979 - XXVIII Congress: Cannes, France
 1981 - XXIX Congress: New York City, United States
 1983 - XXX Congress: Luxembourg, Grand Duchy of Luxembourg
 1985 - XXXI Congress: The Hague, Netherlands 
 1987 - XXXII Congress: Quebec, Canada
 1989 - XXXIII Congress: Interlaken, Switzerland

As of 1989, the Congress has once again become an annual event :

 1990 - XXXIV Congress: Strasbourg, France
 1991 - XXXV Congress: Mexico City, Mexico
 1992 - XXXVI Congress: Berlin, Germany
 1993 - XXXVII Congress: San Francisco, United States
 1994 - XXXVIII Congress: Marrakech, Morocco
 1995 - XXXIX Congress: London, England
 1996 - XXXX Congress: Madrid, Spain
 1997 - XLI Congress: Philadelphia, United States
 1998 - XLII Congress: Nice, France
 1999 - XLIII Congress: New Delhi, India 
 2000 - XLIV Congress: Buenos Aires, Argentina 
 2001 - XLV Congress: Turin, Italy 
 2002 - XLVI Congress: Sydney, Australia 
 2003 - XLVII Congress: Lisbon, Portugal 
 2004 - XLVIII Congress: Geneva, Switzerland 
 2005 - XLIX Congress: Fes, Morocco
 2006 - L Congress: Salvador, Brazil 
 2007 - LI Congress: Paris, France 
2008 - LII Congress: Bucarest, Romania 
 2009 - LIII Congress: Seville, Spain 
 2010 - LIV Congress: Istanbul, Turkey 
 2011 - LV Congress: Miami, United States 
 2012 - LVI Congress: Dresden, Germany
 2013 - LVII Congress: Macao (SAR), People's Republic of China 
2014 - LVIII Congress: Florence, Italy 
 2015 - LIX Congress: Valencia, Spain
 2016 - LX Congress: Budapest, Hungary
 2017 - LXI Congress: Toronto, Canada 
2018 - LXII Congress: Porto, Portugal 
2019 - LXIII Congress: Luxembourg, Grand Duchy of Luxembourg, under the High Patronage of His Royal Highness Grand Duke
2020 - LXIV Congress: Virtual Congress. 
2021 - LXV Congress: Madrid, Spain, Hybrid Congress under the Honorary Presidency of His Majesty the King Felipe VI, presential in Madrid or Virtual.

Resolutions and Charters 
 Resolution on the situation in Poland (Luxembourg Congress, Luxembourg - November 2019)
Core Principles of the Legal Profession (Congress in Porto, Portugal - October 2018)
Resolution Against All Forms of Slavery (Congress in Porto, Portugal - October 2018)
Basic Principles on the Status of Refugees (Congress in Budapest, Hungary - October 2016)
 Resolution on Privacy in Digital Communication (Congress in Valencia, Spain - October 2015)
 Corruption, Transparency and Justice Resolution (Congress in Macau, China 2013)
 Resolution on Globalisation, Tolerance and the Law (Congress in Seville, Spain 2009)
 Resolution for the right to health as a basic human right.(Congress in Fes, Morocco August 31 - September 5, 2005)
 Resolution advocating for the abolishment of the death penalty (Congress in Lisbon, Portugal - September 30, 2003)
 Code of Conduct for Lawyers in the 21st Century that takes into account rapid changes in technology and the forces of globalization (Congress in Sydney, Australia October 27–31, 2002)
 Principles for lawyers establishing a firm outside of their country, adopted and presented to the World Trade Organization (Congress in Sydeny, Australia - October 27–31, 2002)
 Resolution on Multidisciplinary Practices aiming to preserve the core values of the legal profession (Congress in New Delhi, India - November 3, 1999)

UIA Publications
 Enjeux européens et mondiaux de la protection des données personnelles, Editions Larcier, June 2015
 Le DIP au quotidien / IPR in het Dagelijkse Leven, Editions Larcier, November 2015
 Current trends in Start-Ups and Crowd Financing, Ed. Thomas Kulnigg, UIA - LexisNexis Publications Collection, December 2017
 Compliance – Challenges and Opportunities for the Legal Profession, Ed. Guido de Clerq, UIA - LexisNexis Publications Collection, December 2017
 Le statut des femmes et l'état de droit, Editions Larcier, July 2018
 Recognition and Enforcement of Foreign Judgments and Arbitral Awards, UIA - LexisNexis Publications Collection, October 2018
 Natural Resources Exploitation: Business and Human Rights, UIA - LexisNexis Publications Collection, October 2018
Legal Aspects of Artificial Intelligence, UIA - LexisNexis Publications Collection, November 2019
Drafting Effective International Contracts of Agency and Distributorship – A practical Handbook, UIA - LexisNexis Publications Collection, November 2019
International Public Procurement, UIA - LexisNexis Publications Collection, November 2019
Family Law: Challenges and Developments from an International Perspective, UIA - LexisNexis Publications Collection, June 2020
Environmental Law and Sustainable Development, UIA - LexisNexis Publications Collection, September 2020
Fashion law : Legal trends and new challenges, UIA - LexisNexis Publications Collection, October 2020

Juriste International Magazine 
Juriste International is the trilingual magazine (English, French, Spanish) of the UIA. Published four times a year, it has a circulation of 3000 copies.

It presents articles by authors - members or not members of the association - on national and international legal hot topics.

Editor-in-Chief: Barbara Gislason, Minnesota, United States.

UIA Awards 
UIA also rewards legal professionals for their scientific work, their professionalism, their involvement in the defence of the rule of law or for the innovative aspect of their professional practice.

Monique Raynaud-Contamine Award 
The Monique Raynaud-Contamine Award has been awarded from 1999 to 2018 for the best written reports submitted at the association's annual congresses.

 1999 : Nelson LANDRY, Canada : Les techniques biométriques d'indentification
 2000 : Augusto LOPES-CARDOSO, Portugal : Dimension juridique de l'Intervention génétique
 2001 : Sandra BERBUTO & Christine PEVEE, Belgium : La protection pénale des mineurs en droit belge

Carlo MASTELLONE, Italy : Sales-related issues not covered by the CISG: assignment, set-off, statute of limitation, etc., under Italian law

 2002 : W. Carter YOUNGER, USA : Employee privacy, electronic communications and workplace monitoring
 2003 : Sascha R. GROSJEAN, Germany : Protecting trade secrets and commercial information – Rights of employers and employees (Young Lawyer Award)

Stefano DINDO, Italy : How to negotiate a cross-border business deal

 2004 : Francesca PIZZI, Italy : Economic analysis of personality rights concerning media activities (Young Lawyer Award)

Jorge MARTI MORENO, Spain : Migration of companies within the World Trade Organization, European Union and worldwide

 2005 : Rosario LEON, Spain : Los principios de precaución y desarrollo sostenible en España (Young Lawyer Award)

Peter TURNER, UK : Ethics in International Arbitration

 2006 : Felipe ZANCHET MAGALHAES, Brazil : Commercial representation or agency contract : legal implications (Young Lawyer Award)

James MOORE, USA : Economic globalization and its impact upon the legal profession Luis ZARRALUQUI, Spain : El arbitraje en Derecho de Familia en general y en España en particular – La problemática de los procesos en los procesos arbítrales

 2007 : Raquel AZEVEDO, Portugal : Corporate governance on non-listed companies - Special features in connection with family-run companies (Young Lawyer Award)

Howard H. SPIEGLER, USA : Restitution of nazi-looted art: view from the United States

 2008 : Gavin LLEWELLYN, UK : The protection of tri-dimensional trade marks: the UK perspective (Young Lawyer Award)

Judith GIBSON, Australia: Detention after sentence

 2009 : Cristina COJOCARU, Romania : Legal uncertainty in Family Law (Young Lawyer Award)

Carolina PINA, Spain : Copyright in the digital age: from dadaism to mash-up

 2010 : Makato SHIMADA, Japan : Protection of cultural properties in Japan
 2011 : Judith GIBSON, Australia : Turning a good newsroom bad: white collar crime, tort and case management issues arising from the UK phone hacking scandal
 2012 : Christina PHILLIPS, USA : Litigation arising out of natural disasters: a policy examination from the United States (Young Lawyer Award)

Francis GERVAIS, Canada : Qui est le client ?

 2013 : Motoyasu HIROSE, Japan : Asset prevention Japanese prevention (Young Lawyer Award)

Francisco RAMOS ROMEU, Spain : El embargo internacional de créditos en la UE

 2014 : Jean-François HENROTTE, Belgium : Application territoriale de la législation européenne en matière de protection des données : vaincre la peur de l’autre
 2015 : Iñigo GUTIERREZ VELASCO, Spain : Derecho concursal y derecho laboral. El despido colectivo en empresas en crisis: ¿Cierre de empresa o centro de trabajo en el ámbito europeo? (Young Lawyer Award)

Janice MULLIGAN, USA : How would you like your Pacemaker to be hacked? Healthcare cyber vulnerability: a risk management nightmare for the 21st century

Maria CRONIN, UK (Special Mention – Young Lawyer)

 2016 : Ingrid BOURBONNAIS JACQUARD, France : Les actions directoires contre les assureurs – Le droit d’action directe contre le P&I Club, conception française (Young Lawyer Award)

Ian DE FREITAS, UK : Towards an international regulatory approach for mass surveillance and profiling – Striking the balance between national security and privacy

Barbara BANDIERA, Italy (Special Mention)

 2017 : Barbara BANDIERA, Italy : Radiography of a project financing for the Implementation of a wind Farm New EU legislative Framework for markets in Financial instruments
 2018 : Barbara GISLASON, USA : What do the Applications of Gene Editing, Artificial Intelligence and Big Data Brings To The Fields of Life Science, Medical Supply, Food Supply and Environmental Impact?

Jacques Leroy Prize 
From 2010 to 2017, Jacques Leroy Prize was awarded to a law student who, by his or her written submission, promoted the recognition of human rights in the business world.

 2010 : Angela STONIER, Australia
 2011 : Josephine WONG, Canada
 2012 : Somda MANGLOIRE, Burkina Faso
 2013 : Joel FOX, Israël
 2014 : Adja CEVC, Slovenia
 2015 : Jonathas LIMA, Brazil
 2016 : Serge Théophile BAMBARA, Burkina Faso
 2017 : Matheus RICCI PORTELLA, Brazil

Rule of Law Award 
Since 2016, UIA, in partnership with LexisNexis, acknowledges and publicises individuals and/or organisations for their commitment and actions to the development and promotion of the Rule of Law.

 2016 : Malaysian Bar Association, Malaysia
 2017 : Saidbek NURITDINOV, President of the Union of Advocates of the Republic of Tajikistan, Tadjikistan
 2018 : The Honorable Ruth BADER GINSBURG, Associate Justice of the United States Supreme Court
 2019 : Bertrand FAVREAU, President of IDHAE, France
 2020 : ELIL, European Lawyers in Lesvos, Greece
 2021 : Latifa SHARIFI, Afghanistan

LegalTech Inspiration Award 
In 2021, UIA and LexisNexis launched the LegalTech Inspiration Award in order to encourage innovation in the legal field and reward the organizations or individuals that bring new ideas to the legal world which change lawyers’ outlook, practice or working methods.

 2021 : Thomas SEEBER, Realest8, Austria

References

External links 

 
Legal organizations based in France
International professional associations
Bar associations
Organizations established in 1927
International organizations based in France